"I'm In a Different World" is a song written and produced by Brian Holland, Lamont Dozier, and Edward Holland Jr. 
Billboard described the single as a "smooth swinger that moves and grooves throughout" which "should
fast prove a sales topper."

Background
"I'm in a Different World" is the final single that Holland–Dozier–Holland produced for the Four Tops before they left the label due to royalty disputes with Motown. The label issued the song in 1968 as the follow-up single to "Yesterday's Dreams".

Credits
Lead vocal by Levi Stubbs
Background vocals by Abdul "Duke" Fakir, Lawrence Payton and Renaldo "Obie" Benson
Additional background vocals by The Andantes
Instrumentation by The Funk Brothers

Chart history
"I'm in a Different World" peaked at number 51 on the US pop chart and number 27 on the UK chart.

References

1968 singles
Four Tops songs
Motown singles
Songs written by Holland–Dozier–Holland
1968 songs
Song recordings produced by Lamont Dozier
Song recordings produced by Brian Holland